You're Only Young Once is a 1937 comedy film directed by George B. Seitz. Following A Family Affair, it is the second film of the Andy Hardy series. Lewis Stone replaces Lionel Barrymore as Judge Hardy while Fay Holden replaced Spring Byington as his wife since both Barrymore and Byington were too expensive for the sequel's modest budget. Mickey Rooney would repeat his role as Andy while Cecilia Parker, as his sister, and Sara Haden, as Aunt Milly, would also reprise their roles from the original film. They were the only original actors transferred to the series.

Synopsis
The Hardy family goes to Catalina for a two-week vacation, where Judge Hardy (Lewis Stone) tries to catch a swordfish, Marian (Cecilia Parker) falls in love with a married lawyer/lifeguard, and Andy goes around with a "sophisticated" girl. They return home to Carvel to find that by having endorsed a note for Frank Redmond (Frank Craven), Judge Hardy might lose all their property to Hoyt Wells (Selmer Jackson). Luckily, through an old law that Judge Hardy learned about while fishing with Capt. Swenson (Charles Judels), their home is saved and Hoyt Wells is run out of town.

Cast
 Lewis Stone as Judge James K. Hardy
 Cecilia Parker as Marian Hardy
 Mickey Rooney as Andy Hardy
 Fay Holden as Mrs. Emily Hardy
 Frank Craven as Frank Redmond (Carvel newspaper owner)
 Ann Rutherford as Polly Benedict
 Eleanor Lynn as Geraldine 'Jerry' Lane
 Ted Pearson as Bill Rand (lifeguard)
 Sara Haden as Aunt Milly Forrest
 Charles Judels as Capt. Swenson of the Shorty II
 Selmer Jackson as Hoyt Wells (land speculator)

References

External links
 
 
 
 

1937 films
Films directed by George B. Seitz
1930s English-language films
American black-and-white films
Metro-Goldwyn-Mayer films
1937 comedy films
American comedy films
1930s American films